Pseudaletis busoga is a butterfly in the family Lycaenidae. It is found in Cameroon, the Democratic Republic of the Congo, Uganda and Tanzania. The habitat consists of forests.

References

Butterflies described in 1939
Pseudaletis